The following are telephone codes in Cape Verde.

Overview 

Telephone numbers in Cape Verde are 7 digits long (except for special 1xx codes), and must always be dialed in their entirety (a closed dialing plan). The first 3 digits of a fixed-line (non-mobile) number correspond to its geographic area. Calls within a given 2xx area, and between certain areas, are considered local calls and priced accordingly. Mobile numbers have no geographic area, and calls to or from national mobile numbers are treated the same regardless of location.

History 

On July 3 2004, 2 was prepended to all fixed-line numbers, and 9 to all mobile numbers, increasing the number length to 7 digits.

Calling format 

 xxx xxxx - calling inside Cape Verde
 +238 xxx xxxx - calling from outside Cape Verde
The NSN length is seven digits.

Numbering plan

Number ranges 

In all cases listed, when a 2x range is split between two islands, one takes 2x0 through 2x4, while the other takes 2x5 through 2x9.

Special numbers 

 102 - Information
 130 - Hospital
 131 - Fire protection
 132 - Police

References 

 

Cape Verde
Communications in Cape Verde
Cape Verde communications-related lists